Andrew James O'Brien (1897–1969) was a New Zealand rugby footballer who represented New Zealand with the All Blacks and in rugby league.

Rugby union career
O'Brien began his career playing rugby union for Marlborough between 1919 and 1921. He also played for a combined Nelson-Marlborough-Golden Bay-Motueka side against the 1921 Springboks in the side's 26–3 defeat. In that game he lined up alongside fellow future dual-international Charles Fitzgerald.

In 1922 he moved north to Auckland, joining the Grafton club. He immediately was selected for the North Island side and subsequently the All Blacks tour of New Zealand and South Wales. He finished the tour having played in 3 games and scored one try. Returning to Auckland, O’Brien played his first game for the union late in the 1922 season. In 1923 he played five games for Auckland.

Rugby league career

O'Brien switched to rugby league in 1924, joining Marist in the Auckland Rugby League competition. He played for Auckland and made the New Zealand national rugby league team for three tests against the touring Great Britain Lions side that year. He toured Australia in 1925 and gained another two Kiwi test caps playing against Great Britain when they toured again in 1928.

In 1929 he served as the secretary of the Marist club.

References

1897 births
1969 deaths
Dual-code rugby internationals
New Zealand rugby union players
New Zealand international rugby union players
Marlborough rugby union players
Auckland rugby union players
Rugby union hookers
New Zealand rugby league players
New Zealand national rugby league team players
Auckland rugby league team players
Marist Saints players
North Island rugby league team players
Rugby league props
North Island rugby union players
Rugby union players from Blenheim, New Zealand